Phi-Phi is an opérette légère in three acts with music by Henri Christiné and a French libretto by Albert Willemetz and Fabien Solar. The piece was one which founded the new style of French comédie musicale, the first to really use the latest rhythms of jazz (one-step, fox trot) along with a plot which emphasised comedy – with risqué dialogue of puns and anachronisms – more than the romantic style, which had predominated before. The success of the piece prompted imitators in Paris such as Le petit Phi-Phi (3 March 1922) and Les amants de Phi-Phi (13 March 1923). It also led to a spate of similarly titled stage works: Clo-Clo, Dédé, You-You, Pan Pan...  A 1922 London production, in English, was very successful.

Performance history
Phi-Phi opened on 12 November 1918, directly after the end of the First World War, at the Bouffes-Parisiens. After about three months it became a major hit, running for three years.  A Paris revival was very successful in 1979-80.

An English-language production premiered at the London Pavilion on 16 August 1922.  It starred Stanley Lupino, Evelyn Laye, Arthur Roberts and Clifton Webb.  The translation was by Fred Thompson and Clifford Grey, and the score included additional songs by Herman Darewski, Nat Ayer and Cole Porter.  This became a hit, playing for over 1,000 performances in London.

A French film version was made in 1926, and it is still revived from time to time in France. It was recorded for French Radio in 1956.

Roles

Synopsis
Setting : the workshop of Phidias in Greece, around 600 BC.

Act I
The sculptor Phidias (Phi-Phi) has received a commission to create a group representing 'L’amour et la Vertu fondent le Bonheur Domestique' ('Love and Virtue are the Foundation of Domestic Bliss'). After having looked over many models for 'la Vertu', he chooses Aspasie, a charming girl whom he had met in the streets of Athens. The girl pays him a visit, and he gets overcome by her attractions. Protecting herself from his advances with her umbrella, she breaks the arms off the Venus de Milo and the head from the Winged Victory of Samothrace...
Madame Phidias enters and makes jealous comments to her husband. Aspasie leaves. Alone with Le Pirée, secretary and confidant of her husband, Madame Phidias, as a faithful spouse, tells him how she had encountered a handsome young man who has been pursuing her. This is none other than Prince Ardimédon, who now enters. Embarrassed, Madame Phidias leaves Le Pirée with the prince; Phi-Phi returns and after trying to sell him some sculptures (and his wife) engages the young man as the model for 'L’Amour'.

Act II
Le Pirée having lost money at the races using Phidias’s sculptures as wagers, the models agree to pretend to be the works of art. Pericles makes a visit to the sculptor and with Phi-Phi away, meets Aspasie; he too is overcome by her charms. (Her song imitates the refrain of "Je suis toujours tout étourdie" from Manon).
Pericles leaves and Madame Phidias comes in. She quickly gets rid of Aspasie telling her that her husband has decided not to use her as a model. Madame Phidias believes that only she can truly represent ‘Vertu’, and reluctantly Phi-Phi agrees. Madame Phidias takes her place beside Ardimédon, but the sculptor is called away, and the prince leads his virtuous partner off to a room nearby.

Act III
Next day back in his studio Phi-Phi finds Ardimédon and his wife in each other’s arms. He commends them for finding such an ideal pose for his sculpture, and sets to work, all the while surprised that his wife has not asked him where he was all night.
Aspasie enters and tells Phi-Phi that she is to marry Pericles : which won’t stop her continuing her liaison with Phi-Phi which was consummated the previous night. 
When Pericles arrives he demands that Aspasie is included as one of the models for the sculpture - as 'L’Economie' (thrift), and the work will become 'L’Amour et la Vertu, aidés par l’Economie, fondent le bonheur conjugal'. After some machinations by Le Pirée to recoup his financial losses, all ends happily.

References

Compositions by Henri Christiné
French-language operas
1918 operas
Opérettes
Operas
Operas based on classical mythology